Barry Thomas may refer to:

Barry Thomas (cricketer) (born 1956), New Zealand cricketer
Barry Thomas (decathlete) (born 1972), British athlete
Barry Thomas (rugby union) (1937–2018), New Zealand rugby player
Barry Thomas (sound engineer) (1932–2017), American film sound engineer
Barry Thomas (speedway rider) (born 1951), British speedway rider
Barry Thomas (artist and filmmaker), New Zealand artist and film maker